The Topp Twins (born 14 May 1958) are the folk singing and activist sister comedy duo of New Zealand entertainers Jools and Lynda Topp. They are known for their country music influenced style, live shows and television performances. They often perform as characters, the most notable being the roles Ken & Ken, and Camp Mother & Camp Leader.

Career 

The Topp Twins have performed as a country music-singing comedy duo since the 1970s. They started singing together and performing when they were children. Busking in Auckland on Queen Street in the 1980s was formative to their dynamic as entertainers with a regular Friday night appearance. They were singing political songs of protest, about topics such as Māori land rights at Bastion Point and Nuclear Free New Zealand. Both have been openly lesbian since the 1970s, and were advocates for homosexual law reform.

The Topp Twins developed characters for the banter and audience interaction around their music. As Jools said: "We made ourselves look ridiculous ... we asked them to laugh at us, not to laugh at someone else's misfortune." In 2019 arts centre Expressions in Upper Hutt hosted an exhibition on the Topp Twins created by Te Manawa Museum in Palmerston North. Expressions director Leanne Wickham describes the appeal of the Topp Twins:"They are able to draw people into their music and talk about the issues that are important to us using humour – whether it is Bastion Pt, the Springbok Tour or climate change."

Television 
In the late 1990s, they created their own TV series Do Not Adjust Your Twinset, which ran for three seasons and showcased their iconic cast of New Zealand characters, including Camp Mother & Camp Leader, the Bowling Ladies and Ken & Ken, roles for which they cross-dressed as 'typical kiwi blokes'. The series won the twins several awards at the New Zealand Film and Television Awards and screened on the ABC and Foxtel networks in Australia. They have appeared on numerous specials and as guests. A cooking show called Topp Country ran over three seasons from 2014 to 2016.

Film 
A documentary feature film about the sisters titled The Topp Twins: Untouchable Girls, directed by Leanne Pooley, was released in April 2009. It broke all previous records for opening day, and opening weekend, for a New Zealand documentary. After just four weeks at the box office, it made over $1 million. As of 2011, it has made over $1.82 million in worldwide box office sales. The movie was produced by Arani Cuthbert. The cinematographer was Leon Narbey. It was well received and has been shown at numerous film festivals worldwide, winning awards at the Toronto International Film Festival, Melbourne International Film Festival, Göteborg International Film Festival, Portland International Film Festival and the 2009 New Zealand Film and Television Awards.

Untouchable Girls is the title of a well-known song by the Topp Twins, about standing up for what you believe in.

Personal lives

Both Jools and Lynda are openly lesbian. In March 2013, Lynda married her long-time partner Donna Luxton, a preschool teacher. At the time of their marriage, same-sex marriage was not legal in New Zealand, so the couple entered into a civil union as a substitute for marriage. Same-sex marriage was made legal in New Zealand just a few months after the wedding.

Before the third reading of the Marriage (Definition of Marriage) Amendment Bill, which ultimately passed and legalised same-sex marriage in New Zealand, the Topp Twins publicly endorsed the bill in a post on their website. In a statement, Lynda said, "Everybody should be able to stand up and say 'I'm getting married'. A Civil Union is demeaning, this idea that you will never be good enough, that your love is somehow less than or not as worthy. There's no romance to it. And today, I feel more romantic and more in love than I've ever felt in my life."

Breast cancer
In 2006 Jools was diagnosed with breast cancer and underwent treatment including mastectomy. From this experience the sisters incorporated Jool's personal story of treatment and recovery into a Topp Twins stage show that toured New Zealand including raising funds for the New Zealand Breast Cancer Foundation. She and her sister Lynda were already breast cancer activists and continue to use their celebrity status to educate the public about the disease.

In 2022, it was revealed that both Lynda and Jools are both battling breast cancer since 2021, but decided to receive separate treatments to prevent contracting COVID-19.

Recognition and awards

In 1984 the Topp Twins were named NZOA Group of the Year. The sisters were made Members of the New Zealand Order of Merit (MNZM) in 2004.

They were presented with the Rielly Comedy Award from the Variety Artists Club of New Zealand in 2009.

In 2010 Wintec awarded the twins honorary masters degrees. In 2011, Waikato University awarded them honorary doctorates.

2010 Qantas Film and Television Awards – Best Entertainment Programme: The Topp Twins and The APO

2017 New Zealand Television Awards – Best Presenter – Entertainment (shared between Lynda and Jools Topp): for Topp Country, season two.

In the 2018 Queen's Birthday Honours, both Lynda and Jools Topp were appointed Dames Companion of the New Zealand Order of Merit, for services to entertainment.

In 2019, the twins jointly won a Lifetime Achievement award in the NEXT Woman of the Year awards.

Aotearoa Music Awards
The Aotearoa Music Awards (previously known as New Zealand Music Awards (NZMA)) are an annual awards night celebrating excellence in New Zealand music and have been presented annually since 1965.

! 
|-
| 2008 || Topp Twins || New Zealand Music Hall of Fame ||  || 
|-

Discography

Studio albums

Compilation albums

Extended plays

References

External links

Topp Twins TV show on NZ On Screen.
Biography of Jools Topp
Biography of Lynda Topp

APRA Award winners
Lesbian musicians
Lesbian comedians
New Zealand LGBT musicians
Yodelers
People from Huntly, New Zealand
New Zealand comedy duos
New Zealand twins
New Zealand musical duos
Dames Companion of the New Zealand Order of Merit
Female musical duos
Twin musical duos
Comedy theatre characters
Comedy musicians
Theatre characters introduced in 1981
New Zealand LGBT singers
New Zealand country music groups